People called Scrimgeour
 Alexander Scrimgeour (1897–1916), Author of "Scrimgeour's Scribbling Diary" who was killed at the Battle of Jutland 
 Colin Scrimgeour, 20th-century New Zealand Methodist minister and broadcaster.
 Henry Scrimgeour, 16th-century Scottish librarian and religious controversialist.
 John Scrimgeour of Myres, 16th-century Scottish architect, Master of Work to the Crown of Scotland
 John Scrimgeour (Canadian politician), 19th-century Prince Edward Island politician
 Robert Shedden Scrimgeour (1788–1863), Scottish aristocrat and stockbroker

People called Scrimgour
 Derek Scrimgour (born 1978), Scottish footballer (St. Mirren FC)

See also
 Scrymgeour
 Clan Scrymgeour

People in fiction called Scrimgeour
 Rufus Scrimgeour, a character in novels by J. K. Rowling.

References